Dale Jerome Willis (born May 29, 1938) is a retired American college and professional baseball player who was a pitcher in Major League Baseball (MLB) for a single season in 1963.

Willis was born in Calhoun, Georgia.  He attended the University of Florida in Gainesville, Florida, where he played for coach Dave Fuller's Florida Gators baseball team in 1955 and 1956.  As a senior in 1956, he posted three consecutive games with ten or more strikeouts, averaged 11.9 strikeouts per game, and earned an All-SEC selection.  He was later inducted into the University of Florida Athletic Hall of Fame as a "Gator Great" in 1976.

Willis was signed by the Kansas City Athletics in 1960, and spent six years playing for their minor league affiliates.  For the   Athletics, he appeared in 25 games pitched, all in relief, and posted an 0–2 win–loss record with a 5.04 earned run average (ERA).  He allowed 46 hits and 25 bases on balls in 44 innings pitched, with 47 strikeouts. Willis was credited with one save, earned May 25 against the Los Angeles Angels.  He also got into one game as a pinch runner.

See also 

 Florida Gators
 List of Florida Gators baseball players
 List of University of Florida Athletic Hall of Fame members

References

External links 
, or Pura Pelota

1938 births
Living people
Baseball players from Georgia (U.S. state)
Birmingham Barons players
Dallas Rangers players
Florida Gators baseball players
Kansas City Athletics players
Leesburg A's players
Major League Baseball pitchers
People from Calhoun, Georgia
Portland Beavers players
Shelby Rebels players
Shreveport Sports players
Sioux City Soos players
Syracuse Chiefs players
Tiburones de La Guaira players
American expatriate baseball players in Venezuela
Toronto Maple Leafs (International League) players